Holoptic refers to one of the ways in which the arthropod eye develops, particularly the eyes of various species of insects. Unlike dichoptic and cycloptic eyes, holoptic eyes meet along the median dorsal line of the head, in many species nearly covering the exterior of the head. Holoptic eyes are typical of several Dipteran males, in particular some Syrphidae, Tabanidae, Pipunculidae, and Acroceridae. Some other insect orders that include species with holoptic males and some in which the females are holoptic as well, include the Coleoptera, Anisoptera, and Archaeognatha.

References
 

Insect anatomy
Eye